Courtney Houssos is an Australian politician. She has been a Labor member of the New South Wales Legislative Council since the 2015 state election. She is currently the Shadow Minister for Better Regulation and Innovation in the NSW Shadow Cabinet.

Houssos was born Courtney Roche in Forster, New South Wales. She was educated at Forster High School. She later studied for a Bachelor of Arts in international relations at the University of New South Wales, where she met her future husband, George Houssos. At university, she entered student politics as a member of the student representative council protesting against university fee reform, and continued in politics as the first female Labor Party organiser for country New South Wales.

In 2014, the New South Wales Labor Party removed Amanda Fazio from the party's upper house ticket at the 2015 state election, and Houssos was preselected to replace her. She was elected as the youngest Labor member of the Legislative Council.

References

Living people
Members of the New South Wales Legislative Council
Australian Labor Party members of the Parliament of New South Wales
University of New South Wales alumni
People from the Hunter Region
Year of birth missing (living people)
Place of birth missing (living people)
21st-century Australian politicians
Women members of the New South Wales Legislative Council
21st-century Australian women politicians